Jim Stafford is the 1974 debut album from American singer Jim Stafford.  It was issued subsequent to the release of the first two singles.  The LP reached #55 on the U.S. Pop albums chart. On the Country chart, it peaked at #6.

The LP features four songs which became U.S. Top 40 hits:  "Swamp Witch" (#39 Billboard, #31 Cash Box), "Spiders & Snakes" (#3), "My Girl Bill" (#12) and "Wildwood Weed" (#7).  All but the first were higher-charting hits in Canada, as was the album itself (#48).

Track listing
Side one
 "L.A. Mamma" (Jim Stafford) – 2:24
 "I Ain't Sharin' Sharon" (Jim Stafford) – 2:14
 Medley : "Mr. Bojangles" (Jerry Jeff Walker) / "A Visit with an Old Friend" (Jim Stafford) – 5:10
 "Wildwood Weed" – 2:41 (Don Bowman)
 "16 Little Red Noses and a Horse That Sweats" (Jim Stafford) – 3:54
 "Spiders & Snakes" – 3:07 (Jim Stafford, David Bellamy)

Side two
 "The Last Chant" (Jim Stafford) – 3:19
 "My Girl Bill" – 3:13 (Jim Stafford)
 "Nifty Fifties Blues" (Jim Stafford) – 3:03
 "A Real Good Time" (Jim Stafford/Martin Cooper) – 3:33
 "Swamp Witch" – 3:48 (Jim Stafford)

Charts

References

1974 albums
MGM Records albums